Ahmed Kadry Genena (born 17 July 1935) is an Egyptian former sports shooter. He competed in the trap event at the 1964 Summer Olympics. He also won a bronze medal at the 1963 Mediterranean Games.

References

External links
 

1935 births
Living people
Egyptian male sport shooters
Olympic shooters of Egypt
Shooters at the 1964 Summer Olympics
Place of birth missing (living people)